Beraberi is a village in Singur CD Block in Hooghly district in the Indian state of West Bengal.

Geography  

Demographics
As per the 2011 Census of India Beraberi had a total population of 6,810 of which 3,454 (51%) were males and 3,356 (49%) were females. Population below 6 years was 644. The total number of literates in Beraberi was 5,173 (83.90% of the population over 6 years).

Economy

Tata Motors at Singur

Singur gained international media attention since Tata Motors started constructing a factory to manufacture their $2,500 car, the Tata Nano at Singur. The small car was scheduled to roll out of the factory by 2008. In October 2008, Tatas announced withdrawal from the project. Six villages – Bajemelia, Beraberi, Gopalnagar, Joymolla, Khaser Bheri and Sinher Bheri – were affected by land acquisition. In 2016, the Supreme Court quashed the West Bengal government’s acquisition of 997 acres of agricultural land for Tata Motors and ordered its return to 9,117 landowners.

Education
Beraberi Suryya Narayan Memorial High School is a coeducational higher secondary school. It has arrangements for teaching Bengali, English, Sanskrit, history, geography, economics, mathematics, physics and chemistry.

Transport
Madhusudanpur railway station on Howrah-Bardhaman chord line is the nearest railway station.

References

Villages in Hooghly district